John "Jack" Hastings (1858 – March 1935) was an Irish international footballer who played club football for Ulster and Knock as a centre half.

Hastings earned a total of seven caps for Ireland between 1882 and 1886.

External links
NIFG profile

1858 births
1935 deaths
Irish association footballers (before 1923)
Pre-1950 IFA international footballers
Ulster F.C. players
Association football midfielders